A Norwegian Minnesotan (colloquially sometimes known as a Minnewegian) is a Norwegian American in the U.S. state of Minnesota. As of 2009, 868,361 Minnesotans claim Norwegian ancestry — equivalent to 16.5% of Minnesota's population and 18.7% of the total Norwegian American population.

Settlement 

Many Norwegian settlers arrived and lived in various other locations in the United States before permanently settling in Minnesota. The first Norwegian emigrants to come to the United States often settled in the eastern Midwest. As more and more new immigrants came to America there was a rapid increase in population at the original Norwegian settlements (which was helped along by a high birth rate). Thus, as more and more Norwegian settlers arrived, the original Norwegian settlements would move westward where land was plentiful and less expensive and where new settlements could be created.

Norwegian settlement in Minnesota increased after the American Civil War and the Dakota War of 1862, especially to the Minnesota River Valley, where land was taken through the Treaty of Traverse des Sioux. Following the war, the majority of the Dakota people were expelled from Minnesota and European settlement subsequently increased rapidly. Because the land of Minnesota was taken by force from the American Indians, land was cheap for European immigrants. Before long, this immigrant population grew exponentially in Minnesota.

Norwegians settled all over the state, but they established the first permanent settlements in the southeast. The first Norwegian settlement in Minnesota was Norwegian Ridge, in what is now Spring Grove, Minnesota. Another such settlement was the 1851 colony in Goodhue County, Minnesota. They soon settled in Fillmore County as well. By 1860, half of Minnesota's 12,000 Norwegians resided in Goodhue, Fillmore, and Houston Counties. Ten years later, these three counties were home to nearly 25,000 of Minnesota's 50,000 Norwegian residents. By 1880, there were Norwegian settlements, beyond what has been previously listed, in the counties of Freeborn, Steele, and Waseca. Norwegians also made settlements in Blue Earth, Brown, and Watonwan (the "Linden Settlement"), Lac qui Parle County, the Park Region in west-central Minnesota, and the prairies of southwestern Minnesota.

Immigrants also came to the Red River Valley in northwestern Minnesota, settling in the counties of Clay, Marshall, Norman, and Polk. During the early 1870s, the St. Paul and Pacific Railroad helped increase migration to the Red River Valley. As a result, by 1875 Norwegian immigrants made up a 30 percent of the total population of the counties of Polk and Clay. Later, immigrants also made homes in Grant, Pennington, Red Lake, Roseau, and Kittson Counties. Much of this land belonged to the Lakota and Nakota peoples.

The city of Duluth was also a center for Norwegian immigration. Its location on Lake Superior provided Norwegian fishermen with ample employment. As a result, the Norwegian population of Duluth increased dramatically between 1870 and 1900. In 1870, 242 Norwegians were counted in Duluth. By 1900 the population had reached 7,500 people of Norwegian ancestry.

By the middle of the 1880s, Norwegian migration to Minnesota began to shift to the cities. There was a large influx of Norwegian immigrants into the city of Minneapolis from the 1880s to early 20th century, along with a less substantial migration to St. Paul.

Demographics 

Of Minnesota's population in the year 2000, 850,742 said that they have Norwegian ancestry. Of them 414,901 (48.8%) were male, and 435,841 (51.2%) were female. As of 2008, the median age was 36, in contrast to 35 for the whole Minnesotan population, 36.7 for the whole American population, and 39.4 for Norway's population.

Among Norwegians in Minnesota, 54,411 were younger than the age of 5 (or 6.9% of all those with Norwegian ancestry); of the whole Minnesotan population, 327,988 were younger than the age of 5 (or 6.6% of all Minnesotans). Among Norwegian Minnesotans, 65,039 were between 5 and 17 years of age (or 7.6% of all those with Norwegian ancestry), compared to 365,136 between 5 and 17 for the whole Minnesotan population (or 7.4% of all Minnesotans). Among the group, 628,343 were between 18 and 64 (or 73.8% of all Norwegian Minnesotans), compared to 3,632,940 between 18 and 64 for the whole Minnesotan population (or 73.8% of all Minnesotans). Among the group, 102,949 were older than 65 (or 12.1% of all those with Norwegian ancestry), compared to 593,415 older than 65 for the whole Minnesota population (or 12.0% of all Minnesotans).

The household population number 835,511, when the group quarters population number 15,231. The average household size is 2, when the average family size is 3. Occupied housing units number 335,537; of them, owner-occupied housing units number 263,911 and renter-occupied housing units number 71,626.

550,208 are 25 years, or over. Of them, 503,360 are high school graduate or higher, and 156,568 bachelor's degree or higher. 82,959 is civilian veterans (civilian population 18 years and over). 105,537 has disability status (population 5 years and over). 2,034 are foreign born. 191,907 is male, now married, except separated (population 15 years and over) and 197,012 is female, now married, except separated (population 15 years and over). Approximately 24,235 said they speak a language other than English at home (population 5 years and over).

479,191 are in labor force (population 16 years and over). Mean travel time to work in minutes (workers 16 years and over) is 21. Median household income in 1999 (dollars) were 48,441, while median family income in 1999 (dollars) were 57,893, per capita income in 1999 (dollars) were 23,443. Families below poverty level number 7,421, while individuals below poverty level number 43,935. Single-family owner-occupied homes number 207,799. Of them, median value (dollars) number 118,700, median of selected monthly owner costs is not applicable, with a mortgage (dollars) number 1,010, while not mortgaged (dollars) number 263.

Norwegian communities in Minnesota 

The 25 Minnesotan communities with the highest percentage of residents claiming Norwegian ancestry are:

 Fertile, Minnesota 54.4%
 Spring Grove, Minnesota 52.0%
 Twin Valley, Minnesota 49.9%
 Rushford, Minnesota 46.5%
 Starbuck, Minnesota 45.0%
 Hawley, Minnesota 44.5%
 Ada, Minnesota 42.9%
 Ulen, Minnesota 42.2%
 Dawson, Minnesota 42.2%
 Fosston, Minnesota 42.1%
 Bagley, Minnesota 41.0%
 Karlstad, Minnesota 39.4%
 Thief River Falls, Minnesota 39.0%
 Dane Prairie Township, Otter Tail County, Minnesota 39.0%
 Madison, Minnesota 38.8%
 Harmony, Minnesota 38.4%
 Sparta Township, Minnesota 38.1%
 Clarkfield, Minnesota 38.0%
 Wanamingo, Minnesota 38.0%
 Lake Park, Minnesota 37.2%
 Montevideo, Minnesota 35.9%
 Dunn Township, Minnesota 35.2%
 Cormorant Township, Minnesota 34.9%
 Oakport, Minnesota 34.3%
 Houston, Minnesota 34.1%

Norwegian counties in Minnesota 

The 25 Minnesotan counties with the highest percentage of residents claiming Norwegian ancestry are:

 Norman County, Minnesota 58.9%
 Pennington County, Minnesota 50.6%
 Lac qui Parle County, Minnesota 47.9%
 Marshall County, Minnesota 46.9%
 Grant County, Minnesota 43.8%
 Polk County, Minnesota 43.3%
 Clearwater County, Minnesota 42.6%
 Roseau County, Minnesota 42.3%
 Clay County, Minnesota 42.2%
 Pope County, Minnesota 39.7%
 Chippewa County, Minnesota 39.4%
 Fillmore County, Minnesota 39.0%
 Yellow Medicine County, Minnesota 38.9%
 Freeborn County, Minnesota 37.1%
 Kittson County, Minnesota 35.4%
 Red Lake County, Minnesota 33.9%
 Houston County, Minnesota 33.4%
 Swift County, Minnesota 33.4%
 Otter Tail County, Minnesota 32.9%
 Wilkin County, Minnesota 32.2%
 Becker County, Minnesota 28.7%
 Dodge County, Minnesota 28.6%
 Kandiyohi County, Minnesota 28.6%
 Douglas County, Minnesota 27.1%
 Lake of the Woods County, Minnesota 27.0%

Notable people

 Lars K. Aaker
 Johan Arnd Aasgaard
 Douglas K. Amdahl
 Richard Dean Anderson
 Sydney Anderson
 Roger Awsumb

 Dan Bakkedahl
 Earl Bakken
 Beatrice Gjertsen Bessesen
 Theodore C. Blegen
 Robert Bly
 Haldor Boen
 C. L. Brusletten
 Dustin Byfuglien

 Frederick William Cappelen
 Alf Clausen
 Larry Cole
 Theodora Cormontan
 Edgar Christensen
 Theodore Christianson
 Charles A. Christopherson

 George Dahl

 David Ellefson
 Arlen Erdahl
 Hal Erickson (American football)
 Willis H. Flygare

 Jacob Fjelde
 Paul Fjelde
 John Flittie
 Gerhard Forde

 Herbjørn Gausta
 Knut Gjerset
 Oluf Gjerset
 Henry J. Gjertsen
 Alexander Grinager
 David Grose
 Ingebrikt Grose
 Bjarne Elgar Grottum

 Deb Haaland
 Carl G. O. Hansen
 Josh Hartnett
 Sig Haugdahl
 Gabriel Hauge
 Louis J. Hauge Jr.
 Marty Haugen
 Garrett Hedlund
 Tippi Hedren
 Skitch Henderson
 Adolph Herseth
 Ivan Hinderaker
 Einar Hoidale

 John O. Johnson
 Leon H. Johnson
 Ron Johnson
 V. Trygve Jordahl
 Carl O. Jorgenson

 Hannah Kempfer
 Albert C. Knudson

 Odin Langen
 Arthur B. Langlie
 Keith Langseth
 Robert E. A. Lee
 C. Walton Lillehei

 Warren Magnuson
 Pearl McIver
 Ernest O. Melby
 David Minge
 Walter Mondale
 Adolph Murie
 Olaus Murie

 Wayne Nordhagen
 Karen Nyberg

 Ingerval M. Olsen
 Julius J. Olson
 Mark Olson (musician)
 Sara Jane Olson
 Henry Orth

 Oscar S. Paulson
 J. A. O. Preus II

 Carlton C. Qualey
 Al Quie

 Max Ramsland
 Ole Ramsland
 Sarah Ramsland
 Harley Refsal
 Anton J. Rockne
 Karl Rolvaag
 Ole Edvart Rølvaag
 Nils Nilsen Ronning
 Esther Rose
 Erick Rowan

 Peter O. Sathre
 Conrad Selvig
 David Senjem
 Henrik Shipstead
 Dale Smedsmo
 Konrad K. Solberg
 Ossie Solem
 Charles Stenvig
 Carl F. Struck
 Arnold Sundgaard
 Bud Svendsen
 Steve Sviggum
 Laurits Swenson
 Oscar A. Swenson

 Henry O. Talle
 Kari Tauring
 Herman Thorson
 Bud Tingelstad

 Shantel VanSanten
 Andrew Volstead
 Lindsey Vonn

 Owen Harding Wangensteen
 Harold Windingstad

See also 

 Norwegian Americans
 Norwegian Dakotan

References 

Minnesotan